General Bailey may refer to:

Caleb Bailey (1898–1957), U.S. Marine Corps brigadier general
Charles Justin Bailey (1859–1946), U.S. Army major general
Charles R. Bailey (fl. 1970s–2010s), U.S. Army brigadier general
Joseph Bailey (general) (1825–1867), Union Army brigadier general and brevet major general
Mildred Inez Caroon Bailey (1919–2009), U.S. Army brigadier general
Robert E. Bailey (fl. 1970s–2020s), U.S. Air Force Reserve brigadier general
Ronald L. Bailey (fl. 1970s–2010s), U.S. Marine Corps lieutenant general
Rosanne Bailey (1950–2016), U.S. Air Force brigadier general
Vivian Bailey (1869–1938), British Army brigadier general

See also
Attorney General Bailey (disambiguation)